Reynolds is a town in Taylor County, Georgia, United States. The population was 1,086 at the 2010 census.

Geography

Reynolds is located in eastern Taylor County at 32.559167 N, -84.095556 W (32° 33′ 33″ N, 84° 5′ 44″ W).

The town is located in the eastern part of Taylor County along the Fall Line Freeway and Georgia State Route 96, which run from west to east through the center of town.
Via GA-540 and GA-96, Fort Valley is 13 mi (21 km) east, and Butler, the Taylor County seat, is 10 mi (16 km) west. Georgia State Route 128 also
runs through the town, leading northeast 14 mi (23 km) to Roberta and south 19 mi (31 km) to Oglethorpe.

Demographics

2020 census

As of the 2020 United States census, there were 926 people, 486 households, and 229 families residing in the city.

2000 census
As of the census of 2000, there were 1,036 people, 447 households, and 289 families residing in the town. The racial makeup of the town was 48.84% White, 50.58% African American, 0.39% Asian, and 0.19% from two or more races. Hispanic or Latino of any race were 0.77% of the population.

There were 447 households, out of which 23.0% had children under the age of 18 living with them, 41.4% were married couples living together, 19.7% had a female householder with no husband present, and 35.3% were non-families. 32.7% of all households were made up of individuals, and 14.3% had someone living alone who was 65 years of age or older.  The average household size was 2.32 and the average family size was 2.95.

In the town, the population was spread out, with 22.9% under the age of 18, 6.6% from 18 to 24, 23.9% from 25 to 44, 28.1% from 45 to 64, and 18.5% who were 65 years of age or older.  The median age was 42 years. For every 100 females, there were 81.4 males.  For every 100 females age 18 and over, there were 76.4 males.

The median income for a household in the town was $25,347, and the median income for a family was $30,179. Males had a median income of $37,917 versus $20,500 for females. The per capita income for the town was $16,071.  About 17.9% of families and 23.5% of the population were below the poverty line, including 29.7% of those under age 18 and 25.0% of those age 65 or over.

History

The Georgia General Assembly incorporated Reynolds in 1865. The community was named after L. C. Reynolds, a railroad official.

Notable people
 Earl Little Sr., the father of Malcolm X, was born in Reynolds on July 29, 1890.
 Samuel Little (June 7, 1940 – December 30, 2020) was born in Reynolds. Little may have been the most prolific serial killer in American history.

References

Towns in Taylor County, Georgia
Towns in Georgia (U.S. state)